Alfonso Cristián Parot Rojas (born 15 October 1989) is a Chilean footballer who plays for Primera División club Universidad Católica as left back.
	
Parot was used by Marcelo Bielsa as "sparring" for Chile national team.

International career
He represented Chile U23 at the 2008 Inter Continental Cup in Malaysia and Chile U20 at the 2009 South American U-20 Championship.

At senior level, he has been capped five times.

Career statistics

Club

International

International goals
Scores and results list Chile's goal tally first.

Honours

Club
Universidad Católica
 Chilean Primera División: Apertura 2016-17, 2019, 2020, 2021
 Copa Chile: 2011
 Supercopa de Chile: 2016, 2020, 2021

Rosario Central
Copa Argentina: 2017–18

References

External links
 

1989 births
Living people
People from Talca
Chilean footballers
Chilean expatriate footballers
Chilean people of French descent
Chile international footballers
Chile under-20 international footballers
Chile youth international footballers
Club Deportivo Universidad Católica footballers
Ñublense footballers
C.D. Huachipato footballers
Rosario Central footballers
Chilean Primera División players
Argentine Primera División players
Expatriate footballers in Argentina
Chilean expatriate sportspeople in Argentina
Association football fullbacks